Anne-Marie Ørbeck (1 April 1911 – 5 June 1996) was a Norwegian pianist and composer.

Biography
Anne-Marie Ørbeck was born in Oslo in 1911 to Anton Ørbeck (1866–1927) and Inga Louise Larsen (1874–1948). Her brother Gunnar Ørbeck was a violinist. She studied piano in Oslo and in Berlin with Sandra Drouker. She continued her studies in music and composition under teachers including Gustav Fredrik Lange, Mark Lothar, Paul Höffer and Darius Milhaud. She made her debut as a pianist in Oslo in 1933 with the Oslo Philharmonic Orchestra.

In 1939 Ørbeck married engineer Helge Smitt (1906–1985). Her career as a musician and composer was interrupted by World War II, but her song cycle "Vonir i blømetid" (Hope at Blossom-Time) won a prize in 1942 from the Norwegian Society of Composers. In the 1950s, she studied composition again with Nadia Boulanger in Paris, and later with Hanns Jelinek in Vienna. Her Symphony in D Major was premiered in Bergen in 1954, making her the first female Norwegian symphonic composer. She died in Bergen in 1996.

Works
Ørbeck composed works for orchestra, chamber ensemble and solo instrument, but specialized in vocal works, including songs, choral works and psalm compositions. Selected works include:

Orchestral works:
Concertino for Piano and Orchestra, 1938
Melody, Miniature Suite, 1940
Symphony in D major, 1944
Rune March, 1946
Pastorale and Allegro for Flute and Strings, 1959

Piano and chamber works:
Concert Event of R. Strauss' Der Rosenkavalier from Rollers for piano, 1935
Cadenzas for piano concertos by Haydn and Mozart, 1967
Sonatina, 1967
Valse piccante, 1971
Marcia indomabile, 1973
Violin and Piano: Norwegian springar, 1928
Melody, 1931

Songs: 
Vonir in blømetid, 7 songs to poems by HH Holmes, 1942
So they rowed fjordan(text: A. Vaa), 1954
Wild-Guri (text: T. Jonsson), 1955
The rock, 1955
A hustavle (text: A. Overland), 1957
Snow (text: A. Overland), 1959
Star Song (text: I. Krokann), 1964
Choir: A pine (text: HH Holmes), 1946
Ovspel (text: HH Holmes), 1952
Our country (text: A. Overland), 1954
Summer Night (text: A. Overland), 1956
Psalm about the art (text: L. Kvalstad), 1964

Discography
Ørbeck's compositions have been recorded and issued on CD, including:

The Norwegian Flute, BIS
Kittelsen, G.: Festduett/Hegdal, M.: Aleatoric Construction for Piano/VEA, K.: Trio for Flute, Alto Saxophone and Piano (BIT 20 Ensemble), Aurora
Orbeck, A: Symphony/Songs (Hirsti, Royal Philharmonic, Dreier), Aurora

References

1911 births
1996 deaths
20th-century classical composers
Musicians from Oslo
Norwegian classical composers
Norwegian classical pianists
Women classical composers
20th-century classical pianists
20th-century Norwegian musicians
Women classical pianists
20th-century women composers
20th-century women pianists